The Nepalese Military Academy is a training institute for future officers of the Nepalese Army located at Kharipati, Bhaktapur. The mission statement of the academy is to "commission proficient platoon commanders, who are professionally capable of fulfilling their assigned responsibilities skilfully with vigour". It was founded on December 26, 1986.

Sources and Citations

Military academies of Nepal
Military of Nepal